Jos Baxendell (born 3 December 1972, in Manchester, England) is a former Sale Sharks rugby union player and coach. He played in two full tests for England, both in 1998.

References

Living people
1972 births
Sale Sharks players
English rugby union players
England international rugby union players
Rugby union fly-halves